The commissioning pennant (or masthead pennant) is a pennant (also spelled "pendant") flown from the masthead of a warship. The history of flying a commissioning pennant dates back to the days of chivalry with their trail pendants being flown from the mastheads of ships they commanded. Today, the commissioning pennants are hoisted on the day of commissioning and not struck until they are decommissioned. Some navies have a custom of flying a "paying off" or "decommissioning pennant," the length of which often reflects the length of service of the warship.

In the United States, ships in commission in the fleet of the National Oceanic and Atmospheric Administration (NOAA), although not warships, also fly a commissioning pennant.

History

The custom of wearing a pennant at the masthead of a man-of-war stems from Tromp's broom and Blake's whip. During the First Anglo-Dutch War (1652–1654), Dutch Admiral Maarten Tromp lashed a broom to his flagship's masthead as a sign that he had swept the English off the seas. In reply, English Admiral Robert Blake hoisted a whip to the masthead to signify that he would whip the Dutchman into subjection. However, records show that pennants were in use well before this period as the mark of a warship.

In the days of chivalry, knights and their squires carried pennons and pennoncells on their lances, just as men-of-war fly pennants from their masts. Records show that pennants were in use in the 13th century, when merchant ships were commandeered during war and placed in command of military officers, who transferred their trail pendants from their lances to the mastheads of the ships they commanded.

The pennant is an evolution of old "pennoncell", that in the Royal Navy used to consist of three colours for the whole of its length, and towards the end left separate in two or three tails. The tradition continued until the end of the Napoleonic Wars when the Royal Navy adopted the style of pennants used by the service today. Pennants have been carried by warships from the earliest times, prior to 1653 at the yardarm, but since then at the maintopgallant masthead.

Today the pennant is hoisted on the day a warship or establishment commissions and is never struck until the day of decommissioning. It is, however, displaced by Royal Standards and the personal or distinguishing flags or pennants of commodores and admirals. In Navy ships the pennant is flown at the masthead, for which reason it is also commonly referred to as a masthead pennant.

Commissioning pennant

The commissioning pennant reflects the fact that the ship is a ship of war, and is flown until the ship is decommissioned. It is generally taken to signify the commissioned status of the warship. In some navies, the commissioning pennant is used in addition to represent the personal authority of the captain, although it is flown continuously aboard the ship whether the captain is aboard or not.

Royal Navy

In the Royal Navy the commissioning pennant is flown continuously in every ship and establishment in commission unless displaced by a senior officer's Rank flag. The masthead pennant is a cross of St George in the hoist and a white fly. Formerly, when the Royal Navy was divided into red, white and blue squadrons, there were four different pennants in use, the colour of the fly of three of the pennants corresponding with the colour of the squadron ensign, and a fourth for ships on independent commission (i.e. not attached to a squadron, therefore directly under the command of the Admiralty in London), with the fly containing (from top to bottom) red white and blue in a triband form (such ships would wear the red ensign). Modern commissioning pennants are significantly shorter than in previous centuries - typically 1m in length and only 10 cm at the hoist, tapering to a squared-off point.

A boat carrying a captain of one of His Majesty's ships will on ceremonial occasions fly a commissioning pennant from the bows of the boat as a symbol of his authority.

Royal Canadian Navy

Since its creation in 1910, until 1990, the Royal Canadian Navy and afterwards, Maritime Command (after unification into the Canadian Armed Forces) used the same commissioning pennant as the Royal Navy. In 1990, the old version was phased out with a new design; replacing the Cross of Saint George with a stylized Canadian red maple leaf.

Hellenic Navy

In the Hellenic Navy, the commissioning pennant (means Warship Pennant) blue coloured, has shape of isosceles triangle elongated, bearing a white cross near the base of the triangle. The flag has typically base to length (height of triangle) 1 to 20. The cross has arms width 1/5 base length and each arm length 3/5 of base length. The pennant flown on the top of mainmast.

Indian Navy
In the Indian Navy, a white triangular pennant with at hoist the St. George's red cross with the Ashoka Chakra in the center. The length of the horizontal red stripe is 12 times the width at hoist. The width of the stripes is 1/6 of the hoist and the Chakra diameter is 6/15 of the hoist.

United States

United States Navy and United States Coast Guard

The commissioning pennant of the United States Navy is "blue at the hoist, bearing seven white stars; the rest of the pennant consists of single longitudinal stripes of red and white." The commissioning pennant of the United States Coast Guard is a near opposite, being white at the hoist, bearing thirteen blue stars, and with the rest of the pennant consisting of multiple vertical red and white stripes.

Ships of the United States Navy and the United States Coast Guard fly their respective commissioning pennants from the moment of commissioning until the decommissioning ceremony, the only exceptions being when either a flag officer or a civilian official is embarked and the flag officer's or civilian official's personal flag is flown in its place.

The ensign, jack and commissioning pennant are hoisted directly after the reading out of the commissioning order and struck as the final act before the captain declares the ship decommissioned.

The U.S. Navy and U.S. Coast Guard use the respective pennants as the symbol of the vessel's commanding officer.
When the vessel's commanding officer is ashore, the ship will also display the international code flag known as the Third Substitute pennant.

NOAA fleet

The National Oceanic and Atmospheric Administration (NOAA) operates a fleet of research and survey ships which are in commission for United States Government service, although they are not warships. Ships in the NOAA fleet fly a "commission pennant" in a similar manner to U.S. Navy and U.S. Coast Guard ships. The NOAA fleet has three commission pennants, one for its largest ships (which it deems "Class I" vessels), and two for smaller ships NOAA defines as "Class II," "Class III," or "Class IV" vessels. The pennants are identical to those flown by commissioned ships of the United States Coast and Geodetic Survey, one of the ancestor organizations of NOAA, and the red triangles represent the discipline of triangulation used in hydrographic surveys. The flag of the U.S. Coast and Geodetic Survey, used from 1899 to 1970, and that of NOAA, in use since 1970, include a similar red triangle.

Paying-off pennants

It is the custom in many navies for a ship which is "paying off" to wear an extremely long commissioning pennant, which is normally at least the length of the ship, and the length of which reflects the length of service. This is in contrast to the modern practice of using pennants of not more than one or one-and-a-half metres for convenience.

Formerly a ship "paid off" each time she returned home after a commission overseas: the term refers to the fact that sailors were not paid until the ship returned home, to avoid desertion. The bible of Royal Navy traditions and slang, Covey-Crump, emphasises:

"It should be borne in mind that the commission referred to is the length of time the ship's company has been abroad, not the ship herself: when a ship recommissions abroad a fresh commission is started; thus a commission of longer than 2¾ years is exceptional."

This custom is maintained in the United States Navy, where the paying-off pennant is known as the "homeward-bound pennant". Nevertheless, present usage in the Royal Navy has degenerated to using paying-off pennants only as part of a ship's decommissioning ceremony.

See also
 Flag terminology
 Maritime flag
 French ensigns
 Clean sweep (naval), involving the use of a broom

References

Naval flags
Types of flags